The 1985 World Table Tennis Championships women's singles was the 38th edition of the women's singles championship.
Cao Yanhua defeated Geng Lijuan in the final by three sets to one, to win the title.

Results

See also
List of World Table Tennis Championships medalists

References

-
1985 in women's table tennis